Thorneloe may refer to:

Rupert Thorneloe (1969-2009), British Army officer
George Thorneloe (1848-1935), Canadian bishop
Thorneloe University, named for him

See also
Thornloe